The 1999 Thurrock Council election took place on 6 May 1999 to elect members of Thurrock Council in Essex, England. One third of the council was up for election and the Labour party stayed in overall control of the council. Overall turnout in the election was 20.0%.

After the election, the composition of the council was
Labour 45
Conservative 1

Election result

Two Labour candidates were unopposed in the election.

Ward results

References

1999
1999 English local elections
1990s in Essex